Escot may refer to:

 Escot, Pyrénées-Atlantiques, France
 Escot, Talaton, England

People with the surname
 Hagre l'Escot (fl. 1360s), Scottish mercenary captain
 Pozzi Escot (born 1933), Peruvian musician

See also
 Ascot (disambiguation)
 Escott (disambiguation)